Union Pacific 4466 is an  steam locomotive built in October 1920 by the Lima Locomotive Works for the Union Pacific Railroad (UP) to perform switching chores and transfer runs.

History

Revenue service and first retirement (1920-1962)
UP 4466 spent most of its career in Cheyenne, Wyoming, as a shop switcher and was the UP Cheyenne Shop's last steam shop switcher. After its stint in Cheyenne, 4466 was transferred to Grand Island, Nebraska in 1960. The locomotive was retired from revenue service in July 1962. It continued to remain in Grand Island in storage until 1973 when it was donated to the Railway and Locomotive Historical Society.

Excursion career (1984-1999)   
In 1978, No. 4466 was donated to the California State Railroad Museum. In 1984, it was restored to operating service and pulled excursion trains for the museum. In 1986, 4466 ventured to Vancouver, British Columbia, to be part of Steam Expo '86. This was not the only time 4466 took part in such a celebration; it also went to Sacramento (its current home) to take part in the Rail Fair of 1991. 

In 1999, new California emissions regulations banned the operation of coal-fired steam locomotives, which caused the 4466 to be retired and put on indefinite static display. In 2013 it was taken out to take part in the Union Pacific's 150th anniversary celebration. As of 2023, it is currently on static display at the California State Railroad Museum.

Gallery

References

Individual locomotives of the United States
Lima locomotives
4466
0-6-0 locomotives
Standard gauge locomotives of the United States
Preserved steam locomotives of California